Maite Maiora Elizondo (born 20 June 1980) is a Spanish female sky runner and trail runner, who won gold medal at the 2016 Skyrunning World Championships in SkyMarathon, the final ranking of Sky Extreme and overall title of the 2017 Skyrunner World Series and bronze medal at the 2015 IAU Trail World Championships held in Annecy.

Biography
In skyrunning she won also silver medal at the 2016 Skyrunning World Championships in Vertical Kilometer, bronze medal in Vertical Kilometer at the 2015 Skyrunning European Championships held in Chamonix.

2017 SWS Victory
Overall race by race.

References

External links
 Maite Maiora profile at All-Athletics
 Official site

1980 births
Living people
Spanish sky runners
Trail runners
Skyrunning World Championships winners